Jane Rumble  is the Head of the Polar Regions Department for the UK's Foreign and Commonwealth Office.

Early life and education
Rumble graduated with a BSc degree in geography from the University of Exeter.

Career and impact
Rumble was appointed to the position of Head of Polar Regions Department in January 2007, having been Deputy Head since 2003. She began her civil service career in the UK's Department of Environment, where she held a number of roles dealing with corporate and environmental policy, including policy on the health and safety of genetically modified crops. She then worked for the cross-Whitehall Teenage Pregnancy Unit before joining the Foreign and Commonwealth Office, where she began to work on polar policy. Rumble is the fourth Head of the FCDO's Polar Regions Department since 1943. During her time as the Head of Polar Regions, she has been involved in shaping policy relevant to Arctic and Antarctic protection.

Awards and honours
Rumble is a Fellow of the Royal Geographical Society (FRGS) and a Policy Fellow at the Centre for Science and Policy of the University of Cambridge.

She was appointed as an Officer of the Order of the British Empire (OBE) in the 2018 Queen's Birthday Honours List. In July 2018 she was awarded an honorary DSc degree by Leeds University. Rumble Point is at 64° 37′ 30″ S, 62° 33′ 15″ W.

References

External links
 

Year of birth missing (living people)
Living people
British Antarctic scientists
Women Antarctic scientists
21st-century British women scientists
Officers of the Order of the British Empire
Fellows of the Royal Geographical Society
Alumni of the University of Exeter